The Penn Quakers men's squash team is the intercollegiate men's squash team for University of Pennsylvania located in Philadelphia, Pennsylvania. The team competes in the Ivy League within the College Squash Association. The university first fielded a squash team in 1935. The current is head coach is former professional squash player Gilly Lane and the director is Jack Wyant.

History 

The Quakers enjoyed considerable success in the 60s and 70s, winning 3 Ivy League titles. In 2022, they finished the regular season undefeated at 16-0 and captured their first outright Ivy League championship since 1969.

Year-by-year results

Men's Squash 
Updated February 2023.

Players

Current roster 
Updated February 2023.

|}

Notable former players 
Andrew Douglas (squash player) '22, 4x 1st team All-American, 4x 1st team All-Ivy

Aly Abou Eleinen '22, 3x 1st team All-American, 3x 1st team All-Ivy, Individual Tournament Finalist

See also
 List of college squash schools

References

External links 
 

 
Sports clubs established in 2010
College men's squash teams in the United States
Squash in Pennsylvania
2010s establishments in Pennsylvania